Conrad Worrill (August 15, 1941 – June 3, 2020) was an African-American writer, educator, activist, and talk show host for the WVON call-in program On Target. Organizations he was involved with included the Million Man March, and the National Black United Front. Worrill's activism centered on the need for greater independence in African-American life, and helping young people better understand the relationships between power and institutions.

Early life
Worrill was born in Pasadena, California. His father was active in the NAACP and the YMCA, and played a large role in influencing Worrill to become an activist on his own. Conrad moved to Chicago when he was nine. He was married to Arlina Worrill and has several daughters, Femi Worrill, Sobenna Worrill, Michelle Worrill, and Kimberley Aisha King. He became a serious athlete, but was awakened to the prejudice and racial segregation that was present when his swim team faced heckling. Despite racial hardships, Worrill pursued football, basketball, and track. In 1962, Conrad was drafted into the army and stationed in Okinawa, Japan. While abroad, he read much about African American history, culture, and politics. He returned to America in 1963 and attended George Williams College, majoring in Applied Behavioral Sciences.  While at college, his past experience overseas of seeing many African Americans sent to war led him to become active in the Black Power Movement. One of the organizations he was involved with was the Student Nonviolent Coordinating Committee, which was one of the first African American civil rights groups against war.

Worrill also earned a master’s degree in social service administration from the University of Chicago.

Worrill graduated in 1968 and was hired by a West Side YMCA as a program director. He left to pursue his PhD at the University of Wisconsin–Madison. His focus was on "Curriculum and Instruction in Secondary Social Studies". He wanted to help students understand the relationship between institutions and power. Upon receiving his degree from Wisconsin, Worrill taught for two years at George Williams College. In 1975, he transferred to the faculty of Northeastern Illinois University, where he led the Center for Inner City Studies.

Activism
In addition to his teaching duties, Worrill was involved with the National Black United Front. The organization deals with addressing political, social, economic, and cultural forces that impact people of African descent in America today. The NBUF has been known for pushing a program of study that emphasizes the role of Africans and African Americans.

Worrill was the elected economic development commissioner of the National Coalition of Blacks for Reparations in America (N'COBRA).  He was a special consultant of field operations in the Million Man March, which took place on October 16, 1995, and authored a weekly column entitled, Worrill's World.

Death
Worrill died of cancer on June 3, 2020.

Footnotes

References

1941 births
2020 deaths
University of Wisconsin–Madison School of Education alumni
Writers from Chicago
African-American academics
Activists for African-American civil rights
Aurora University alumni
Academics from California
Hyde Park Academy High School alumni
Writers from Pasadena, California
University of Chicago School of Social Service Administration alumni
20th-century African-American people
21st-century African-American people